Dinic's algorithm or Dinitz's algorithm is a strongly polynomial algorithm for computing the maximum flow in a flow network, conceived in 1970 by Israeli (formerly Soviet) computer scientist Yefim (Chaim) A. Dinitz. The algorithm runs in  time and is similar to the Edmonds–Karp algorithm, which runs in  time, in that it uses shortest augmenting paths. The introduction of the concepts of the level graph and blocking flow enable Dinic's algorithm to achieve its performance.

History
Yefim Dinitz invented this algorithm in response to a pre-class exercise in Adelson-Velsky's algorithms class. At the time he was not aware of the basic facts regarding the Ford–Fulkerson algorithm.

Dinitz mentions inventing his algorithm in January 1969, which was published in 1970 in the journal Doklady Akademii Nauk SSSR. In 1974, Shimon Even and (his then Ph.D. student) Alon Itai at the Technion in Haifa were very curious and intrigued by Dinitz's algorithm as well as Alexander V. Karzanov's related idea of blocking flow. However it was hard for them to decipher these two papers, each being limited to four pages to meet the restrictions of journal Doklady Akademii Nauk SSSR. Even did not give up, and after three days of effort managed to understand both papers except for the layered network maintenance issue. Over the next couple of years, Even gave lectures on "Dinic's algorithm", mispronouncing the name of the author while popularizing it. Even and Itai also contributed to this algorithm by combining BFS and DFS, which is how the algorithm is now commonly presented.

For about 10 years of time after the Ford–Fulkerson algorithm was invented, it was unknown if it could be made to terminate in polynomial time in the general case of irrational edge capacities. This caused a lack of any known polynomial-time algorithm to solve the max flow problem in generic cases. Dinitz's algorithm and the Edmonds–Karp algorithm (published in 1972) both independently showed that in the Ford–Fulkerson algorithm, if each augmenting path is the shortest one, then the length of the augmenting paths is non-decreasing and the algorithm always terminates.

Definition

The residual capacity is a mapping  defined as,
 if ,
 
 if ,
 
  otherwise.

The residual graph is an unweighted graph , where
 .

An augmenting path is an – path in the residual graph .

 .

A blocking flow is an – flow  such that the graph  with  contains no – path.

Algorithm
Dinic's Algorithm
 Input: A network .
 Output: An – flow  of maximum value.
 Set  for each .
If , stop and output .

Analysis
It can be shown that the number of layers in each blocking flow increases by at least 1 each time and thus there are at most  blocking flows in the algorithm. For each of them:

 the level graph  can be constructed by breadth-first search in  time
 a blocking flow in the level graph  can be found in  time

with total running time  for each layer.

Special cases 
In networks with unit capacities, a much stronger time bound holds. Thus the algorithm runs in  time.

The resulting algorithm is also known as Hopcroft–Karp algorithm. More generally, this bound holds for any unit network — a network in which each vertex, except for source and sink, either has a single entering edge of capacity one, or a single outgoing edge of capacity one, and all other capacities are arbitrary integers.

Example
The following is a simulation of Dinic's algorithm. In the level graph , the vertices with labels in red are the values . The paths in blue form a blocking flow.

See also
 Ford–Fulkerson algorithm
 Maximum flow problem

Notes

References
 
 
 

Network flow problem
Graph algorithms